Carex breviscapa is a tussock-forming perennial in the family Cyperaceae. It is native to eastern parts of the south east Asia and north eastern  Australia

Description
It has dark brown coloured basal sheaths that eventually split down into fibers. It has modified leaflets that grow at the base of the inflorescence that are much longer than the inflorescence itself. Each inflorescence has three to five nodes with three to five spikes at each node.

Taxonomy
The species was first described by the botanist Charles Baron Clarke in 1894 as a part of the Joseph Dalton Hooker work The Flora of British India. It has four synonyms; Carex curtisii, Carex laxisquamata, Carex lutchuensis and Carex obtusobracteata.

Distribution
The range extends from China in the north west to Japan in the north east. It is also found as far west as Sri Lanka and then south of China in Thailand, Vietnam and Malaysia then through the islands of Borneo, Philippines, Indonesia and New Guinea and as far south east as Queensland in north east of Australia.

See also
 List of Carex species

References

brevicuspis
Plants described in 1894
Taxa named by Charles Baron Clarke
Flora of China
Flora of Taiwan
Flora of Queensland
Flora of Borneo
Flora of Java
Flora of Malaysia
Flora of New Guinea
Flora of the Philippines
Flora of Sri Lanka
Flora of Thailand
Flora of Vietnam